The Breton Liberation Front (or FLB) was a paramilitary organisation founded in 1963 whose aims were to seek greater autonomy for the region of Brittany (Breton language Breizh) separate from the rest of France. Brittany is a province in northwest France, and formed an independent Duchy of Brittany until the treaty of union in 1532. The group allegedly had strong allies with ETA (separatist group) as their struggles were almost the same.

History
Breton Nationalism had been a significant force in the early 20th century through the Breton National Party, but it has been discredited by its association with collaborationism in World War II. The FLB represented a new wave of nationalist politics associated with anti-colonialist ideology. The group claimed that Brittany was oppressed by France acting as a colonial power.

Citizens of Brittany, or, Bretons, retain their own national identity including an independent language from that of France, music and other cultural details. Bretons are considered an ethnic Celtic group with their roots in Brittonic-speaking people from what is today Devon and Cornwall in Britain.

The group was linked to surviving members of earlier nationalist groups, notably Yann Goulet, who was operating from Ireland. The first known FLB attack occurred in June 1966 when a municipal tax office in Saint-Brieuc was bombed, and a note signed by the FLB claimed that they would continue to carry out a campaign of violence against these "occupying symbols of Brittany."

In the following years, the FLB carried out attacks against administrative structures, such as electrical installations, police barracks and statues—mainly by bombing them. The number of attacks peaked in 1968. However, the FLB ensured that no physical injuries or deaths would result from their attacks, which they wished to remain purely symbolic. In this they followed the model of the earlier group Gwenn ha du. They thus gained a reputation in the international community as the "smiling terrorists." There are even reports that the only two known FLB victims during this period were two FLB members themselves, who were killed while trying to defuse a bomb they were afraid may hurt civilians.

Factions in the FLB emerged in the early 1970s, leading to the creation of the militant Breton Revolutionary Army (Armée révolutionnaire bretonne, or ARB). This group acted separately from the FLB and proved to be the durable faction that still exists today. There were several Breton liberation groups that were distinct from the FLB.

Activity 
The first known FLB attack occurred in June 1966 when a municipal tax office in Saint-Brieuc was bombed, and a note signed by the FLB claimed that they would continue to carry out a campaign of violence against these "occupying symbols of Brittany." In the following years, the FLB carried out attacks against administrative structures, such as electrical installations, police barracks and statues—mainly by bombing them. Though the group peaked in 1968 there have been attacks reported as recently as 2014 using incineration tactics.

The FLB ensured that no physical injuries or deaths would result from their attacks, which they wished to remain purely symbolic; in this they followed the model of the earlier group Gwenn ha du, founded 1930. There are reports that the only two known FLB victims during this period were two FLB members themselves, who were killed while trying to defuse a bomb they were afraid may hurt civilians. They thus gained a reputation in the international community as the "smiling terrorists."

One of their most notorious acts was the 1978 bombing of the Palace of Versailles.

Trials and police intervention 
It was in 1969 that the police intervened, confiscating propaganda and weaponry. More than 60 people were arrested, those directly involved in previous attacks were given brief sentences, however within a few months many had been granted amnesty, or pardons, and released. Although created by young Bretons in the early 1960s, the FLB enjoyed popular support, evident during these arrests which revealed that members came from very diverse backgrounds: businessmen, housewives, students, farmers, and even clergy.

Though most had favorable outcomes for the organization, trials bolstered the Breton "liberation" movement as the trials were perceived to be further suppressive action by the government. This period was also marked with a rise in the number of students enrolling in Breton language courses, as being able to speak Breton was seen as legitimizing one's position as a Breton militant.

Notable leaders 

Yann was a prominent force in the Breton Liberation Front, so much so that he fled to Ireland 1948, seeking political asylum. He was an author, businessman and, in some ways politician. In 1999 he formed the "Party for the Organization of Free Brittany" which he led until 2004.

Yann was involved in a "Pro-German witch Hunt" in 1944, where he was held in custody for a year. Upon escape, he was sheltered by fellow Nationalists in Wales. While hidden he was sentenced to life in prison and was forced out of Brittany and into the Republic of Ireland, where he secured citizenship. In 1955 he was given a retrial in France and came back, innocent, to form the "Movement for the Organization of Brittany."

In 1973 Yann ran for political office, lost, then was arrested two years later for involvement with the Breton Liberation Front's bombings. He was released conditionally until 1979 when he and 22 others were charged with security-related offences .

He died in Saint-Brieuc at 101 years old in 2011, where he spent his last days advocating for Breton Nationalism and avoiding being tried as a "wartime collaborator."

Other notable leaders 
Yann Puillandre
Dr Gourves
Fr Le Breton

See also
Party for the Organization of a Free Brittany

Notes

Breton nationalism
National liberation movements
Rebellions in France
Separatism in France
Secessionist organizations in Europe
Organizations established in 1963
Paramilitary organizations based in France
1963 establishments in France